"I Die: You Die" is a song by the British musician Gary Numan, released as a single in August 1980. Released shortly before his fourth album, Telekon, it continued the anthemic style Numan had begun earlier in the year with "We Are Glass". The composer himself described the two singles as "Much the same thing. Both very chorus-orientated with the guitars as the main rhythmic device and the keyboards tinkling over the top".

Background
Like "We Are Glass", "I Die: You Die" had been premiered live during the final legs of Numan's 1979-80 concert tour The Touring Principle, before being recorded. It has since featured regularly in Numan's performances and on his live albums. Stephin Merritt from The Magnetic Fields covered the song on the Random tribute album in 1997. It was remixed for the 1998 collection The Mix and appears on numerous compilation albums.

Lyrically the song was aimed at what Numan saw as an increasingly vitriolic music press:

Release
The original vinyl single was issued in a variety of different colours. It entered the UK Singles Chart at number 8 and peaked at number 6 the following week but was not included on the vinyl release of Numan's Telekon album, released two weeks later. It did, however, appear on overseas releases of the album, replacing the song "Sleep by Windows", as well as the cassette release.

An alternative mix was used for the music video and a limited edition, white-labelled single release. This mix is the version used on all subsequent reissues of Telekon as a bonus track.

The UK single B-side was a solo piano version of one of Numan's most popular songs, "Down in the Park" which is played by Denis Haines. In the US, Australia and other countries where "I Die: You Die" supplanted "Sleep by Windows" on Telekon, the latter track was used as the B-side of the single.

Track listing
 "I Die: You Die" (Gary Numan) - 3:40
 "Down in the Park (Piano Version)" (Numan) - 4:16

Production credits
 Producers:
 Gary Numan
 Musicians:
 Gary Numan: Vocals, Minimoog, Polymoog, Roland Jupiter-4, Roland CR-78, Guitar
 Paul Gardiner: Bass guitar
 Cedric Sharpley: Drums
 Russell Bell: Backing vocals
 Denis Haines: Piano, Minimoog, Polymoog, Yamaha CP-30, Backing vocals

Chart performance

References

Bibliography
 Paul Goodwin (2004). Electric Pioneer: An Armchair Guide to Gary Numan, Helter Skelter Publishing, 

Gary Numan songs
1980 songs
Songs written by Gary Numan
Beggars Banquet Records singles
1980 singles